Bane Vasic is an engineer at the University of Arizona, Tucson. He was named a fellow of the Institute of Electrical and Electronics Engineers (IEEE) in 2012 for his contributions to coding theory and its applications in data storage systems and optical communications.

References

Fellow Members of the IEEE
Living people
Year of birth missing (living people)
Place of birth missing (living people)
University of Arizona faculty